Belafike is a town and commune in southwestern Madagascar. It belongs to the district of Ampanihy, which is a part of Atsimo-Andrefana Region. The population of the commune was estimated to be approximately 10,000 in 2001 commune census.

Only primary schooling is available. The majority 80% of the population of the commune are farmers, while an additional 19.5% receives their livelihood from raising livestock. The most important crop is cassava, while other important products are peanuts, maize and sweet potatoes.  Services provide employment for 0.5% of the population.

References and notes 

Populated places in Atsimo-Andrefana